Marios Hadjiandreou (born September 19, 1962) is a Cypriot triple jumper who won gold medals in Commonwealth Games and Mediterranean Games.

He won the gold medal in both the 1987 and 1991 Mediterranean Games. In 1990, he became the first Cypriot to win a gold medal in the Commonwealth Games, beating the English world class athlete Jonathan Edwards who later became World Champion and Olympic champion.

He participated in the Olympic Games with Cyprus, in 1988, placing 21st with a 15.95m jump, and in 1992, placing 37th with a 15.64m jump. He was the flag bearer for the Cyprus Olympic team on both occasions.

He was national champion 12 times and is the Cyprus Record holder with 17.13m since 1991. He won 12 times in the European Cup (athletics) and three gold medals in the Games of the Small States of Europe in 1991, 1993, 1995.

International competitions

References

External links
 
 Athletic portraits by GSP Web Site 
 
 

1962 births
Living people
Athletes (track and field) at the 1982 Commonwealth Games
Athletes (track and field) at the 1988 Summer Olympics
Athletes (track and field) at the 1990 Commonwealth Games
Athletes (track and field) at the 1992 Summer Olympics
Athletes (track and field) at the 1994 Commonwealth Games
Commonwealth Games gold medallists for Cyprus
Commonwealth Games medallists in athletics
Athletes (track and field) at the 1987 Mediterranean Games
Athletes (track and field) at the 1991 Mediterranean Games
Mediterranean Games gold medalists for Cyprus
Olympic athletes of Cyprus
Cypriot triple jumpers
Cypriot male athletes
Male triple jumpers
Mediterranean Games medalists in athletics
Medallists at the 1990 Commonwealth Games